Feed Your Head may refer to:

"Feed your Head", is the refrain of "White Rabbit" written by Grace Slick
Feed Your Head, is an album from Pink Floyd bootleg recordings